The  2019–20 Estonian Cup was the 30th season of the Estonian main domestic football knockout tournament. Flora won their eight title after defeating Narva Trans in the final. The winner of the Cup were to qualify for the first qualifying round of the 2020–21 UEFA Europa League, but as Flora were already qualified for the Champions League the spot passed on to Paide Linnameeskond.

First round (1/64)
The draw was made by Estonian Football Association on 25 May 2019.
League level of the club in the brackets.
Rahvaliiga RL (people's league) is a league organized by Estonian Football Association, but not part of the main league system.

Byes
These teams were not drawn and secured a place in the second round without playing:
 Meistriliiga (Level 1): JK Tallinna Kalev, FCI Levadia, FC Flora, FC Kuressaare, Nõmme Kalju FC
 Esiliiga (2): FC Flora U21, Pärnu JK Vaprus, Tartu JK Welco, Tallinna JK Legion
 Esiliiga B (3): Viimsi JK, Võru FC Helios, JK Tabasalu, FC Nõmme United, Keila JK
 II Liiga (4): FC Jõgeva Wolves, Raplamaa JK, Pärnu JK Poseidon, FC Kose, Põhja-Tallinna JK Volta II, Läänemaa JK 
 III Liiga (5): Rumori Calcio Tallinn, FC Tarvastu ja JK Tõrva ÜM, JK Loo, Tallinna FC Hell Hunt, FC Äksi Wolves, FC Järva-Jaani, Anija JK 
 IV Liiga (6): Kristiine JK, Tallinna JK Jalgpallihaigla, Viimsi Lõvid, Tallinna FC Eston Villa II
 Rahvaliiga (RL): FC Puhkus Mehhikos, Npm Silmet, Rasmus Värki Jalgpallikool, SC ReUnited, FC Elbato, FC Teleios, Team Helm, Kohtla-Nõmme

Second round (1/32)
The draw for the second round was made on 15 July 2019.

Third round (1/16) 
The draw for the third round was made on 9 August 2019.

Fourth round  (1/8)
The draw for the fourth round was made on 11 September 2019.

Quarter-finals
The draw for the fourth round was made on 29 February 2020.

Semi-finals

Final

References

External links
 Official website 

Estonian Cup seasons
Cup
Estonian
2020 in Estonian football
Estonian Cup